Sedenak is a mukim in Kulai District, Johor, Malaysia.

Geography

The mukim spans over an area of 232 km2.

Demographics
The mukim has a total population of 14,845 people.

Tourist Attraction
Sedenak Hua Guo Shan Temple (士年纳路口花果山) is a hill Temple dedicated to Monkey God, it is also a popular tourist attraction for local and oversea devotees.

References

Kulai District